The Raj Bhavan (translation: Government House) at  Darjeeling is the summer residence for the Governor of West Bengal, It is located in the city of Darjeeling, West Bengal.

History
Raj Bhavan used to be the Governor's House during the British era. It was served as the summer residence of the Governors of Bengal. The permanent residence of the Governor was at the Belvedere Estate in Calcutta. However, during the hot summer time, the Governor used to shift his residence to Darjeeling, along with the whole office.

The Governor's House building was purchased in 1877 from the Maharaja of Cooch-Behar. 

Even now, the Governor of West Bengal spends two weeks every summer at the Raj Bhavan in Darjeeling.

References
Guha, Nandini. Governor’s ‘summer holiday’ a 19th Century ritual!. The Indian Express. 10 June 2006. URL retrieved on 2006-07-26.

External links

British colonial architecture in India
Governors' houses in India
Buildings and structures in Darjeeling
Governors' houses in West Bengal
Government buildings in West Bengal
1877 establishments in British India